= Nelson Kitchen =

Canadian skier and boxing coach

Nelson Kitchen is a Canadian former professional alpine ski racer who later became a boxing coach, trainer, and manager. Following his ski racing career, Kitchen coached at the Cougar Boxing Club, helped establish the boxing program at Jasper Place High School in Edmonton, and later coached amateur and professional boxers, including Manny Sobral and Tony Badea.

== Alpine ski racing ==
Kitchen competed on the professional alpine ski racing circuit during the 1970s. Following his competitive career, he was appointed Racing Director at The Ridge ski area in Edmonton. He was later described as a former Alberta champion who had competed on the international racing circuit.

== Amateur coaching ==
In 1981, Kitchen coached at the Cougar Boxing Club. Later that year, he helped establish the boxing program at Jasper Place High School in Edmonton. Kitchen later joined the coaching staff at the Astoria Boxing Club in Vancouver, where he worked with amateur boxer Manny Sobral. Sobral credited Kitchen's technical instruction as a key influence on his development, explaining that fellow coach George Angelomatis concentrated on conditioning and motivation while Kitchen focused on technique. Under their coaching, Sobral won Canadian welterweight championships in 1987 and 1988 and was selected to Canada's boxing team for the 1988 Olympic Games.

== Professional boxing ==
Following Sobral's transition to the professional ranks, Kitchen served as his trainer and manager. He remained in those roles throughout Sobral's rise in professional boxing, including his victory for the IBO world super-welterweight championship. In 1999, Kitchen became trainer of Tony Badea. Before Badea's Canadian and Commonwealth junior middleweight championship bout against Manny Sobral, Kitchen discussed Badea's preparation and his tactical assessment of both fighters in an interview with newspaper The Vancouver Sun. Badea defeated Sobral to win the Canadian and Commonwealth junior middleweight championships before successfully defending the Commonwealth title. In retrospective coverage, Edmonton Journal columnist John Short described Kitchen as "the architect behind Badea's victory."
